Edward Price  (1770–1832) was a 19th century  Anglican priest in Ireland.

Price was born in Queen's County and educated at Trinity College, Dublin. He was Archdeacon of Killaloe from 1809 until his death.

References

Alumni of Trinity College Dublin
Church of Ireland priests
19th-century Irish Anglican priests
Archdeacons of Killaloe
People from County Laois
1770 births
1832 deaths